"Är du min älskling än?" is a song written by Rune Wallebom and originally recorded by Janne Önnerud for the 1977 album Kärlekens hus. He also scored a Svensktoppen hit with the song from the period of 22 May-14 August 1977.

The song's lyrics depict a former prison inmate being released, and now wondering if his partner is still by his side.

The song was also recorded by Vikingarna on the album Kramgoa låtar 5 in 1977., in 2002 by Matz Bladhs and in 2006 by Tommys on the album En dag i taget and by Mats Bergmans on the 2006 album Den stora dagen.

References 

1977 songs
Dansband songs
Mats Bergmans songs
Matz Bladhs songs
Swedish-language songs
Songs written by Rune Wallebom
Songs about prison